Brighton Collectibles (Brighton) is an American accessories manufacturer and retailer, headquartered in City of Industry, California, U.S. with 180 retail stores worldwide.  Brighton products are also sold in boutiques or online.

History 
The concept for Brighton began when founders Terri Kravitz and Jerry Kohl, opened a specialty retail store. In 1991, Terri and Jerry launched Brighton Collectibles with a single collection of belts. Over the years, Brighton has expanded their products to include a line of coordinating accessories and footwear. Luggage and home accessories are included in Brighton's home line.

Brighton is headquartered in the City of Industry, California, and is a division of Leegin Creative Leather Products, also based in the City of Industry, CA.  For more than 30 years, Leegin has been manufacturing belts and other leather accessories at a California factory that has expanded from a shop with five employees to a plant employing more than 600 people. Components for some of the products are manufactured in countries such as France, Italy, Spain, China, Taiwan, Korea and Japan. As of February 2020, the company reports Brighton jewelry being made in Taiwan. Brighton footwear is made in Brazil, Italy and India while Brighton handbags are manufactured in China.

Every October, Brighton Collectibles comes out with their annual "Power of Pink" bracelet, which benefits local Breast Cancer charities.

In 2007, the company won a case before the U.S. Supreme Court to allow price floors in Leegin Creative Leather Products, Inc. v. PSKS, Inc..

References

External links
Brighton Collectibles official website

Companies based in Los Angeles County, California
Clothing retailers of the United States
Retail companies established in 1991
Privately held companies based in California
1991 establishments in California